The Tamron AF 18-270mm F/3.5-6.3 Di II VC LD Aspherical (IF) MACRO is an interchangeable superzoom camera lens for Canon EF-S and Nikon F APS-C bodies, announced by Tamron on July 30, 2008. Less than two years later, it was succeeded by the more compact Tamron 18-270mm F/3.5-6.3 Di II VC PZD.

A review by photozone noted the lens' high lateral chromatic aberration and low edge sharpness, while suggesting that distortion was typical the genre and vignetting relatively modest, while autofocus was "good" and optical stabilisation competitive. The latter was evaluated by DPReview as "at least 3 stops benefit" (sic), adding that while the lens was resistant to flare, changing aperture also shifted focus, making macro shooting difficult.

References

Superzoom lenses
18-270A
Camera lenses introduced in 2008